Angelika Glöckner (born 5 February 1962 in Pirmasens, Rhineland-Palatinate) is a German politician (SPD) and a member of the German Bundestag since 2014.

Education and early career 
Glöckner attended the Hugo-Ball-Gymnasium in Pirmasens, which she graduated from in 1981.

From 1981 to 1983, she worked in the Rheinberger shoe factory. From 1983 to 1985, Glöckner completed an apprenticeship as a clerk in office communication at the Municipality of Pirmasens, where she worked from 1985 to 1987 in the office of Municipal Finance. In the years 1987 and 1988, she worked for the Pirmasenser Messe GmbH, so that she could take over a job in the Office of Culture and Tourism of the city of Pirmasens from 1988 to 1993. Glöckner was active from 1993 to 1999 in the city's public order office, driving license department. From 1999 to 2001, she worked in the city's social services office before being exempted from 2001 to 2014 as staff council chairperson. Furthermore, she completed a training as a management specialist from 1988 to 1992, and from 1996 to 1999 a part-time degree course at the Business and Administrative Academy Kaiserslautern with a focus on business administration and economics.

Political career  
Glöckner has been a member of the SPD since 1995, since February 2014 she is the leader of the SPD city association of Pirmasens, as well as the deputy chairman of the SPD sub-district Pirmasens-Zweibrücken since 20 September 2014.

For the election to the Bundestag in 2013, Glöckner joined the SPD Rhineland-Palatinate and was elected with 81.6% to the 11th place on the state list. She also missed out on the direct mandate in the constituency of Pirmasens with 32.2%. On 12 November 2014, she replaced Sabine Bätzing Lichtenthäler in the Bundestag, who took on her new job as Minister of Social Affairs of the State of Rhineland-Palatinate.

In parliament, Glöckner serves on the Committee on European Affairs and the Committee on Human Rights and Humanitarian Aid. She is also a member of the SPD parliamentary group in the Bundestag's working group on local politics. Since 2019, Glöckner has been serving on the board of the German-French Parliamentary Assembly.

Positions and controversies 
100 days after Glöckner had started her Bundestag mandate, in March 2015, she announced to the Pirmasenser Zeitung that in view of the great need, she considers EU refugee camps in North Africa to be necessary in order to stop trafficking gangs. In addition, the federal government would, of course, be obliged to support municipalities in the accommodation of refugees.

Although she had voted in favor of the second Greek aid package, she also expected action from the new Greek government instead of words in implementing the austerity measures. "Only as long as the country fulfills its obligations, can it expect a concession," said Glöckner to the newspaper.

In the 2013 Bundestag election campaign, she was criticised by Frank Eschrich, chairman of the Left Party of Pirmasens, for inviting people to an election campaign event with "free entry and free skate rental for her guests."

Personal life 
Glöckner is married and has two children, and lives in Lemberg (Pfalz).

Memberships 

 Member of the union Ver.di since 1983
 Member of the Rhineland-Palatinate Ver.di state executive committee of the municipalities department until 2014
 Deputy Chairwoman of the Palatinate Ver.di District Board for municipalities
 Member of the Working Group for Employee Issues (AfA) of the SPD sub-district Pirmasens-Zweibrücken
 Member of the AfA state executive board Rhineland-Palatinate since 2003
 Chairwoman of the Association of Social Democratic Women (AsF) of the sub-district Pirmasens/Zweibrücken
 honorary judge at the Employment Court of Kaiserslautern
 Member of the representative meeting of Unfallkasse Rheinland-Pfalz since 2011
 Member of the nonpartisan Europa-Union Deutschland since 2018

External links 

 Biography in the Bundestag website
 Angelika Glöckner in abgeordnetenwatch.de
 Website of Angelika Glöckner
 Angelika Glöckner on Facebook
 Angelika Glöckner on Twitter

References 

1962 births
Living people
21st-century German women politicians
People from Pirmasens
Members of the Bundestag for Rhineland-Palatinate
Members of the Bundestag 2021–2025
Members of the Bundestag 2017–2021
Members of the Bundestag 2013–2017
Members of the Bundestag for the Social Democratic Party of Germany